Norberto Longo (February 15, 1942 - April 19, 2003) was a Spanish-language sportscaster in the United States. Born in Buenos Aires, Argentina, Norberto Longo primarily provided Spanish-language commentary of soccer matches. A lifelong boxing fan, he hosted the weekly Boxeo Estelar television show on Univision, commenting live on fights featuring Julio César Chávez, Roberto Durán and Wilfredo Gómez, among others.

Professional career
Norberto Longo was the lead sports analyst for Spanish International Network/Univision from 1984 to 1999. He was the former reporting partner of Andrés Cantor for almost a decade on Univision and later with Telemundo 1999 to 2003.

Death
Longo died on April 19, 2003, of a heart attack at the age of 61.

References 

Association football commentators
Argentine people of Italian descent
1941 births
2003 deaths
Boxing commentators
People from Buenos Aires